Clunk may refer to:

 Clunk (EP), 1992 EP by Australian alternative rock group Frente!
 Josiah Clunk, a fictional detective in works of H. C. Bailey
 Clunk, a character from the British cartoon series Robozuna

See also
 Clunker (disambiguation)